Maurice Graef (born 22 August 1969 in Horn, Limburg) is a retired football striker from the Netherlands. He made his professional debut in the 1988-1989 season for VVV-Venlo and ended up playing for Roda JC, NEC Nijmegen before ultimately returning to VVV Venlo.

Honours
VVV-Venlo
 Eerste Divisie: 1992–93

Individual
 KNVB Cup top scorer: 1991–92
 Eerste Divisie top scorer: 1992–93

References

  Profile

1969 births
Living people
Dutch footballers
Eredivisie players
Eerste Divisie players
Association football forwards
Roda JC Kerkrade players
VVV-Venlo players
NEC Nijmegen players
People from Leudal
Footballers from Limburg (Netherlands)